Warthog Games Limited, or Warthog plc, was a British video game developer, located in Cheadle Hulme, Stockport, with studios in Sweden and the United States.

The developer later developed titles as Gizmondo Europe, before the company disbanded; key staff formed Embryonic Studios and the brand was relaunched by CFAO as Warthog Entertainment.

Subsidiaries
Warthog: Texas: A susidiary in Austin, Texas, USA. In February 5, 2003, Warthog plc announced the acquisition of Fever Pitch Studios. In February 6, 2003, Fever Pitch Studios was renamed to Warthog: Texas.
Warthog Sweden/42-bit AB: Originally Atod AB, and became Warthog Sweden/42-bit AB after being acquired in 2002.
Zed Two: Acquired in 2002.

History
Warthog was founded in April 1997, the core of the development team composed of ex-Electronic Arts personnel responsible for, amongst other titles, the hit Privateer 2: The Darkening. With this as the basis, Warthog began to develop something of a speciality in space-flight sims, with follow-up titles Starlancer (which sold over 330,000 units, mainly on PC) and Star Trek: Invasion (achieving over 230,000 units on PlayStation). Since 1999, the company also developed expertise in children's titles, with releases based upon well known franchises such as Tom and Jerry, Looney Tunes, Harry Potter and Asterix.

In 2004, Warthog itself was acquired by Tiger Telematics and became a part of Gizmondo Studios. Collectively, the Cheadle and newly acquired Sweden studios became known as Gizmondo Europe, with the recently acquired Warthog Texas becoming Gizmondo Texas. Their focus from then on would be on the Gizmondo handheld console.

After Gizmondo went bankrupt, key staff from the original team established a new development company, Embryonic Studios.

Warthog were affiliated with the Manchester Metropolitan University course Computer Games Technology. They provided feedback on course content and a selection of placement jobs for third-year students.

List of games

Cancelled titles
BattleBots
Momma Can I Mow The Lawn
Johnny Whatever
X10
Conquest 2: The Vyrium Uprising
Wrath & Skeller
Fallen Kingdoms

BattleBots was a video game based on the BattleBots license for PlayStation 2 and GameCube. It got fairly far in development. Many screenshots were released to media outlets and it obtained a rating from the ESRB, but it was ultimately cancelled after the show was cancelled. However, prototypes of the game were sold on the BattleBots website for $299.98. Additionally, photographic evidence of the game being played proves that there are copies in existence, so the game could be brought to the Internet in the form of a ROM. It has been the dream of lead designer Zuby Ahmed to one day recreate this canceled game.

Momma Can I Mow The Lawn is a video game which started off in development for formats such as the PlayStation 2, but after the developer Warthog Games was purchased by Tiger Telematics to produce titles for the Gizmondo handheld console, it was moved to the Gizmondo. Tiger Telematics went bankrupt in  2006 when the Gizmondo was discontinued, and the status of this game is publicly unknown. It was most likely cancelled.

Johnny Whatever was announced on 20 July 2004 but was later cancelled. It was planned as an action game in a third-person environment, following a punk hero in a futuristic city who used his guitar as his weapon against villains. It started off in development for the PlayStation 2 and Xbox, but became a Gizmondo exclusive when the developer was purchased by Tiger Telematics, makers of the Gizmondo. The game was scheduled for a September 2006 release. A demo for the Gizmondo was made, but it was never released. Upon liquidation of Tiger Telematics and their UK subsidiary Gizmondo Europe in February 2006, the ownership of Johnny Whatever was sold back to the CEO of Warthog Games.

References

External links
Warthog Games Ltd/Warthog plc
Warthog: Texas
Warthog Sweden/42-Bit AB

Defunct video game companies of the United Kingdom
Defunct companies of England
Video game companies established in 1997
Video game companies disestablished in 2006
Companies based in Stockport